"Teenage Mutant Milk-Caused Hurdles" is the eleventh episode of the twenty-seventh season of the American animated television series The Simpsons, and the 585th episode of the series overall. It aired in the United States on Fox on January 10, 2016.

Plot

At Springfield Elementary School, Superintendent Chalmers hires retired Air Force Sergeant Mrs. Carol Berrera as substitute teacher for the fourth grade. Bart starts acting weird when she first enters the room and later realizes that he has a crush on his new teacher.

Meanwhile, Homer has to buy a healthy milk for the family, but Apu makes him buy a cheaper milk full of hormones made by Buzz Cola. The next morning, the family discovers that Bart was the first to wake up and was already dressed for class. Lisa realizes that Bart is only doing that for his new teacher. Homer drives Bart to school only to see her, and they are surprised by other dads, also eavesdropping on her class.

Later, Bart writes "Skinner is a wiener" on the school's wall, but is surprised when Berrera asks to see him after class. At their meeting, she tells Bart that he is way behind in class and needs a tutor. When Principal Skinner offers help on her class by pulling up her maps, Bart and Skinner each realize that they are both trying to impress Berrera.

The next morning, the milk hormones cause Bart to grow facial hair, Lisa to develop acne, Maggie to grow a unibrow. Marge decides to help Lisa while Homer teaches Bart to shave his beard where Homer discovers that he has to take the plastic cover off the blade for it to work properly. Meanwhile, Lisa tries to hide her face with a hoodie, but Marge changes her mind by covering her skin problems with makeup.

At school, Bart pretends he is hurt to draw Berrera's attention and take her away from Skinner to help him with first-aid. At the watching crowd, Nelson discovers that Lisa is using makeup, which makes her popular enough to be invited to a third grade party. The next day, at school, Bart sees Berrera and Skinner kissing in the corridor. He also calls Bart for a meeting, saying that he knows way more things about Berrera than Bart does, and that he does not have a chance to win her. Angry at Skinner's move, Bart decides to prank them by filling a chocolate box given to Berrera by Skinner with class pets such as snakes and frogs.

Later at the third grade party, Lisa realizes that it is about to rain and everyone would see her acne problem if the makeup washes away, resulting in humiliation, but she decides to reveal her problem herself by taking off the makeup in front of everybody, but her skin is clean. She notices that the hormone effects are gone, so she leaves the party embarrassed for making an underwhelming announcement. She also convinces Bart to give up on Berrera and let Seymour date her. When he presents her to his mother Agnes, she gets so disgusted about his mother that she decides to break up with him. Bart consoles Skinner by roasting marshmallows with him and Milhouse at the school, using Bart's permanent record as fuel to the fire, while Lisa plays saxophone inside the music classroom.

At the next morning's breakfast, Lisa is playing saxophone at the kitchen, vowing never to use makeup again, but Bart mocks her by saying "Carnegie Hall" out loud (which according to her would make her dream of playing there not come true). They start fighting on the floor, but they are separated by Maggie who now has a huge mono-brow and super-strength due to the milk hormones.

Reception
"Teenage Mutant Milk-Caused Hurdles" received a 3.6 rating and was watched by 8.33 million viewers, making it Fox's highest rated show of the night.

Dennis Perkins of The A.V. Club gave the episode a B, stating "In the long history of Springfield’s questionable milk products, 'Teenage Mutant Milk-Caused Hurdles’ introduction of Buzz Milk, a hormone-heavy milk-like beverage from the makers of Buzz Cola, might not be up to the comedy standards of malk, or Squeaky Farms Brand Genuine Animal Milk, but the product’s effect of bringing 'precocious puberty' upon Bart and Lisa is also the catalyst for a surprisingly sweet, funny episode. The idea of everyone’s favorite perpetual ten and eight-year-olds getting a patchy ‘stache (Bart) and pimples (Lisa) could have opened the door for a lot of the cynically 'risqué' jokes late-run Simpsons has been known to throw around...Instead, while the episode does suffer from a nondescript guest star and could use more time to fill out Bart and Lisa’s adventures in temporary teenager-dom, Joel H. Cohen’s script makes the kids’ confusion about their new state both character-appropriate and charming."

References

External links 
 

2016 American television episodes
The Simpsons (season 27) episodes